The Grupo de Operações Especiais (Portuguese for Special Operations Group), mostly known by its acronym GOE, was the police tactical unit of the Civil Police of the state of São Paulo, Brazil. It was comparable to Rio de Janeiro's CORE. In 2019, the Governor of the State of São Paulo, João Dória, extinguished the group and its members were moved to the newly created Department of Strategic Police Operations (Departamento de Operações Policiais Estratégicas).

History
Founded in 1991, the GOE served to assist conventional police units in high-risk operations involving hostages and uprisings in the prison system. It was subordinate to the Departamento de Polícia Judiciária da Capital ("Judicial Capital Police Department") - DECAP. In 2005 they moved to new headquarters in Campo Belo in the southern zone of São Paulo which contains infrastructure appropriate to their role as a special forces group.
They recently distinguished themselves by imprisoning Lebanese Citizen Rana Koleilat, who was a fugitive in Brazil. She was involved in schemes that led to defrauding investors of funds.

Structure
The São Paulo GOE has about 200 members, a fleet of 60 vehicles, 5 tactical subdivisions, as well as a specialized Delta unit with its own intelligence service and plain-clothes police and unmarked cars, as well as administrative divisions.

The group has an operational base located in the Campo Belo neighborhood, south side, where there is the necessary infrastructure for civilian police can carry out their missions and training.

The base has a fitness and martial training arts center, climbing wall and abseiling use of local training for CQC (close quarters combat), instruction rooms, meeting rooms, accommodation, dressing rooms, workshop for maintenance weaponry and parking.

There, the police conduct fitness and self defense training with an emphasis on martial arts like Aikido and Jiu Jitsu. Also perform combat training with knives and retractable baton, vehicle approach, use of non- lethal weapons and other aiming to improve the training of police members of the group.

However, the training of fire are usually conducted on the campus of Mogi das Cruzes Police Academy.

Exchanges and courses are often conducted in diverse and renowned national institutions like: CORE/PCERJ, Paratrooper Brigade of the Army, Army Technological Center, and even foreign, such as the Grupo Especial de Operaciones (GEO) of Spain, the American SWAT teams, etc.

The officers of the GOE are enabled in personnel, combat defense in confined environments, patrolling and displacement in areas of high risk, crisis management, expertise in explosives, tactical rappelling, shooting commitment, action and combat CBRN emergencies and other activities of special operations.

Many have worked in other tactical units and some even have served for years the Brazilian Armed Forces.

Role
The GOE was a unit of special features and has the basic assignment assist law enforcement authorities and their agents in judicial police  missions.

This assistance usually occurs when these authorities and agents have to develop activities that, by their complexity, beyond their training or does not have adequate resources to carry materials. It is for the GOE, in the district of DECAP, the activities of specialized preventive policing.

Some basic tasks of the GOE were: 
 Search and Seizure; 
 Escort and/ or removal of extremely dangerous prisoners; 
 Guard public and/ or private interest of the civilian police facilities; 
 Crisis management, such as inmates riot, hostage rescue, control of civil unrest, etc.;
 Incursions in areas of risk, in support of other units or the civilian police in the performance of specialized preventive policing activities.

See also
 Civil Police (Brazil)
 CORE (Brazil)
 Batalhão de Operações Policiais Especiais (Brazil)
 GATE (Brazil)
 List of police tactical units

External links
 GOE 2008/2009
 GOE police cars

Sao Paulo
Special forces of Brazil
Government agencies established in 1991
1991 establishments in Brazil
Non-military counterterrorist organizations
Organisations based in São Paulo (state)
Specialist police agencies of Brazil